Circumstantial Evidence  is a 1952 British crime film directed by Daniel Birt and starring Rona Anderson, Patrick Holt and Frederick Leister. The film was produced by Phil Brandon for Act Films Ltd. It was made as second feature and shot at Shepperton Studios. The film's sets were designed by the art director Norman G. Arnold.

Plot
A woman seeks evidence held by her husband that might prevent her divorce, so she can marry another man.

Cast
 Rona Anderson as Linda Harrison
 Patrick Holt as Michael Carteret
 John Arnatt as Steve Harrison
 John Warwick as Pete Hanken
 Frederick Leister as Sir Edward Carteret
 Ronald Adam as Sir William Harrison
 June Ashley as Rita Hanken
 Peter Swanwick as Charlie Pott
 Lisa Lee as Gladys Vavasour
 Ballard Berkeley as Insp. Hall
 Ian Fleming as Commander Hewitt
 Ben Williams as Brand
 Leonard White as Det. Sgt. Davey

References

External links
 

1952 films
1952 crime films
Films directed by Daniel Birt
British crime films
British black-and-white films
Films set in England
Films shot at Shepperton Studios
1950s English-language films
1950s British films